Salesforce Tower may refer to one of many buildings named for and primarily operated by the American technology company Salesforce:
 Salesforce Tower in San Francisco, United States
 Salesforce Tower (Indianapolis) in Indianapolis, United States
 Salesforce Tower (Sydney) in Sydney, Australia
 Salesforce Tower London in London, United Kingdom
 Salesforce Tower Atlanta in Atlanta, United States